Richard Gallagher may refer to:

 Richard B. Gallagher, Scottish academic publisher
 Richard F. Gallagher (1909–1995), American coach
 Richard "Skeets" Gallagher (1891–1955), American actor

See also
 Dick Gallagher, American pianist and composer